British science fiction writer Arthur C. Clarke formulated three adages that are known as Clarke's three laws, of which the third law is the best known and most widely cited. They are part of his ideas in his extensive writings about the future.

The laws 
The laws are:
 When a distinguished but elderly scientist states that something is possible, he is almost certainly right. When he states that something is impossible, he is very probably wrong.
 The only way of discovering the limits of the possible is to venture a little way past them into the impossible.
 Any sufficiently advanced technology is indistinguishable from magic.

Origins 
One account claimed that Clarke's "laws" were developed after the editor of his works in French started numbering the author's assertions.  All three laws appear in Clarke's essay "Hazards of Prophecy: The Failure of Imagination", first published in Profiles of the Future (1962). However, they were not all published at the same time. Clarke's first law was proposed in the 1962 edition of the essay, as "Clarke's Law" in Profiles of the Future.

The second law is offered as a simple observation in the same essay but its status as Clarke's second law was conferred by others. It was initially a derivative of the first law and formally became Clarke's second law where the author proposed the third law in the 1973 revision of Profiles of the Future, which included an acknowledgement. It was also here that Clarke wrote about the third law in these words: "As three laws were good enough for Newton, I have modestly decided to stop there".

The third law is the best known and most widely cited. It was published in a 1968 letter to Science magazine and eventually added to the 1973 revision of the "Hazards of Prophecy" essay. In 1952, Isaac Asimov in his book Foundation and Empire (part 1.1 Search for Magicians) wrote down a similar phrase "... an uninformed public tends to confuse scholarship with magicians..." It also echoes a statement in a 1942 story by Leigh Brackett: "Witchcraft to the ignorant, ... simple science to the learned". Even earlier examples of this sentiment may be found in Wild Talents (1932) by Charles Fort: "...a performance that may someday be considered understandable, but that, in these primitive times, so transcends what is said to be the known that it is what I mean by magic," and in the short story The Hound of Death (1933) by Agatha Christie: "The supernatural is only the nature of which the laws are not yet understood." Virginia Woolf's 1928 novel Orlando: A Biography explicitly compares advanced technology to magic:

Clarke gave an example of the third law when he said that while he "would have believed anyone who told him back in 1962 that there would one day exist a book-sized object capable of holding the content of an entire library, he would never have accepted that the same device could find a page or word in a second and then convert it into any typeface and size from Albertus Extra Bold to Zurich Calligraphic", referring to his memory of "seeing and hearing Linotype machines which slowly converted 'molten lead into front pages that required two men to lift them'".

Variants of the third law 
The third law has inspired many snowclones and other variations:
 Any sufficiently advanced extraterrestrial intelligence is indistinguishable from God. (Shermer's last law)
 Any sufficiently advanced act of benevolence is indistinguishable from malevolence (referring to artificial intelligence)
 The following two variants are very similar, and combine the third law with Hanlon's razor
 Any sufficiently advanced cluelessness is indistinguishable from malice (Clark's law)
 Any sufficiently advanced incompetence is indistinguishable from malice (Grey's law)
 The following two variants describe Poe's law
 Any sufficiently advanced troll is indistinguishable from a genuine kook
 The viewpoints of even the most extreme crank are indistinguishable from sufficiently advanced satire
 Any sufficiently advanced technology is indistinguishable from a rigged demo
 Any sufficiently crappy research is indistinguishable from fraud (Andrew Gelman)
 Any sufficiently advanced hobby is indistinguishable from work

Corollaries 
Isaac Asimov's Corollary to Clarke's First Law: "When, however, the lay public rallies round an idea that is denounced by distinguished but elderly scientists and supports that idea with great fervour and emotion – the distinguished but elderly scientists are then, after all, probably right."

A contrapositive of the third law is "Any technology distinguishable from magic is insufficiently advanced." (Gehm's corollary)

See also 
 
 Asimov's

References

External links 

 The origins of the Three Laws
 "What's Your Law?" (lists some of the corollaries)
 "A Gadget Too Far" at Infinity Plus

Adages
Arthur C. Clarke
Technology folklore
Technology forecasting
Principles